Victoria Seaman is a Republican former member of the Nevada Assembly, representing District 34 in Clark County. She served in the 78th session, from 2014–2016. Seaman was the first Republican Latina elected to the Nevada Assembly.

Background and education
Seaman was born in Santa Maria, California. She has an Associate degree in Political Science from the College of Southern Nevada. She has a bachelor's degree in Urban Studies with a minor in Family Studies from the University of Nevada, Las Vegas. She is an entrepreneur who created and managed day spas, and designed and manufactured a
high-end product line for estheticians. She sold those businesses in 2004 and 2009. She worked as a realtor and a licensed esthetician. Seaman currently serves as the Ward 2 City Council representative for the city of Las Vegas, but still holds Real Estate and Business Broker licenses in the State of Nevada. She is married and has one child.

Tenure
Seaman was the Assistant Majority Party Whip (South). She was vice chair of the Assembly Commerce and Labor Committee and served on the Judiciary Committee and the Legislative Operations and Elections Committee.

Seaman campaigned against raising taxes in 2014. She voted against the commerce tax and the education initiative during her term in the assembly.

In early March 2015, Seaman voted for a school construction bond supported by Nevada Governor Brian Sandoval and introduced by Senate Republicans. Seaman was removed in December 2014 from the Taxation Committee by Assembly Speaker Designate John Hambrick because she opposed Governor Sandoval's tax plan.

In 2016 Seaman co-sponsored a bill, AB-386, to crack down on squatting.

2016 run for State Senate 
Seaman did not seek re-election to the Nevada State Assembly in 2016. Instead, Seaman was the 2016 Republican nominee for District 6 of the Nevada Senate. Seaman defeated Assemblyman Erv Nelson in the primary on an anti-tax platform.  On November 8, 2016, Democrat Nicole Cannizzaro defeated Seaman in the general election, 51 percent to 49 percent.

2018 Congressional election 
Seaman entered the race for Nevada's 3rd Congressional District in August 2017, but dropped out of the race in March 2018 after a family friend, Danny Tarkanian entered race.

2019 Las Vegas Ward 2 Councilperson 
Victoria Seaman was elected in the June 11, 2019 Special Election to complete the term for Ward 2 that ends in 2021. A special election was called when Councilman Steve Seroka resigned before finishing his term in office.

Electoral history

References

External links
Official page at the Nevada Legislature
Campaign site
Nevada elections, 2014
Nevada elections, 2016
Nevada elections, 2018 
https://ballotpedia.org/Victoria_Seaman Victoria Seaman's profile on Ballotpedia
 

Hispanic and Latino American women in politics
Living people
Women state legislators in Nevada
Republican Party members of the Nevada Assembly
Las Vegas City Council members
College of Southern Nevada alumni
Year of birth missing (living people)
21st-century American politicians
21st-century American women politicians
American politicians of Cuban descent
Latino conservatism in the United States